Ctenosaura macrolopha, the Sonoran spiny-tailed iguana or Cape spinytail iguana, is a species of iguana native to Mexico.

References 

Ctenosaura
Endemic reptiles of Mexico
Fauna of the Sonoran Desert
Reptiles described in 1972
Taxa named by Hobart Muir Smith
Fauna of the Sierra Madre Occidental
Sinaloan dry forests